Emily Jane Rushton (1850 – 30 June 1939) was a British archer.  She competed at the 1908 Summer Olympics in London.  Rushton competed at the 1908 Games in the only archery event open to women, the double National round.  She took 24th place in the event with 323 points.

References

References
 
 
 Emily Rushton's profile at Sports Reference.com

1850 births
1939 deaths
Archers at the 1908 Summer Olympics
Olympic archers of Great Britain
British female archers
20th-century British women